The 2011 Open de la Réunion was a professional tennis tournament played on hard courts. It was the first edition of the tournament which was part of the 2011 ATP Challenger Tour. It took place in Réunion and was originally scheduled to last between 24 and 30 January 2011. The tournament has not been finished, as all singles quarterfinal and doubles semifinal matches has been cancelled by the supervisor, due to heavy rain and flooding.

Singles entrants

Seeds

 Rankings are as of January 17, 2011.

Other entrants
The following players received wildcards into the singles main draw:
  Florent Serra
  Quentin Robert
  Clement Maas

The following players received entry from the qualifying draw:
  Yann Drieux
  Olivier Duberville
  Mark Sibilla
  Philippe Vadel

Events

Singles

Singles event has not been completed due to flooding. No championship has been awarded.

Doubles

Doubles event has not been completed due to flooding. No championship has been awarded.

External links
 ITF Search 
 ATP official site

References

2011 ATP Challenger Tour
2011 in Réunion
Hard court tennis tournaments
Tennis tournaments in France
Sport in Saint-Denis, Réunion
2011 in French tennis
January 2011 sports events in Africa
2011 in African sport
2011